The Incredible Journey is a 1963 adventure film directed by Fletcher Markle and produced by Walt Disney Productions. Based on the 1961 novel of the same name by Scottish writer Sheila Burnford, the film follows the adventure of Luath the Labrador Retriever, Bodger the Bull Terrier, and Tao the Siamese cat as they journey 300 miles (480 km) through the Canadian wilderness to return to their home. The film's human cast consists of Émile Genest, John Drainie, Tommy Tweed, and Sandra Scott, with Rex Allen providing narration.

Released on November 20, 1963 by Buena Vista Distribution, the film received $4.2 million in overall rentals, and was mostly praised for its nature scenes and for Allen's narration. However, the human scenes, including the climactic ending, were criticized for disrupting the mood of the film. It was the final film to be scored by longtime Disney composer Oliver Wallace, who died two months prior to its release.

Plot

One night, deep in the forests of Ontario, bachelor John Longridge plans a long hunting trip. His housekeeper Mrs. Oakes  is coming the next day, so he leaves her a note, including how he plans to let the three animals staying with him - Tao the Siamese Cat, Luath the Yellow Labrador, and Bodger the elderly English Bull Terrier - out for a morning run. He retires to bed, and reflects on how his friend John Hunter (Luath's owner, who lives nearly 250 miles away) received an offer for a visiting fellowship at Oxford University. Tao and Bodger belong to Hunter's children Elizabeth and Peter, respectively, and Longridge offered to take in all three pets while the family was away. Tao, meanwhile, accidentally knocks the crucial half of the note into the fireplace, destroying it.

The next day, Longridge lets the animals into his yard for a run, and departs. Before Mrs. Oakes can arrive, Luath hears wild geese traveling home, and decides he wants to go home, too. He leaves the yard, and the other two follow. They intend to travel due west until they get there, not knowing how far it is. Mrs. Oakes and her husband Bert arrive, and assume that Longridge has taken the animals with him.

The animals soon realize Bodger, due to his age, is a liability. Having no means of getting food from humans without getting caught, they continue to forge ahead, but Bodger eventually collapses. Tao goes off to hunt some birds, and Luath goes off in search of water. Two black bear cubs discover Bodger, but he does not respond to their play, so they decide to wrestle each other. The mother bear comes running at the noise, thinks Bodger has hurt her cubs, and tries to attack. Tao and Luath return and drive off the bear, and Bodger eats a bobwhite that Tao has killed for him, regaining his strength.

The animals travel on, hunting as they go. They are forced to pass through the yard of a sawmill, where Bodger attempts to raid the cookhouse trash can, only to be shot at by the cook. Luath catches a rabbit, but Bodger and Tao discover an old hermit, Jeremy, who has dementia. Jeremy mistakes them for human guests, and tries to serve them food, but then distractedly eats it all himself. Later still, the two dogs swim across a river while Tao walks across on a beaver dam. It breaks, and Tao is washed miles downstream, where he is rescued by a little Finnish girl named Helvi. He hurries to catch up with the dogs, narrowly avoiding being eaten by a lynx on the way.

Shortly after being reunited, the animals encounter a porcupine, which spikes Luath in the face. Seeking water to alleviate the pain, Luath is found by hunter James Mackenzie. He takes Luath back to his farm, where Bodger has already arrived and made friends with Mackenzie's wife Nell. The dogs are treated and fed, and locked in the barn for the night. Meanwhile, Longridge returns home, and he and Mrs. Oakes quickly piece together the truth. Longridge starts calling all the ranger stations and outposts for help, and news of sightings comes in from all over.

Tao manages to free the dogs, and the trio wanders into the harsh Ironmouth Mountains, where there will be no more help from humans, and a terrible wintery climate. The Hunters return home to the sad news that Mackenzie was the last to see the animals alive. Elizabeth refuses to believe Tao will die, but Peter and Mr. Hunter accept that Bodger and Luath are likely no more. They decide to celebrate Peter's birthday to take their mind off of things.

Elizabeth hears a dog barking during the party, believes it's Luath, and convinces her father to whistle for the dog. Hunter whistles, and Luath appears, quickly followed by Tao, joyfully reuniting with the family. Peter mourns for Bodger, who is not there, but then notices the old dog slowly approaching from far behind the others. Peter runs to meet him, and the other two animals return to Bodger's side, so they can all complete their journey together.

Cast
Emile Genest as John Longridge
John Drainie as Professor James Hunter
Sandra Scott as Nancy Hunter
Marion Finlayson as Elizabeth Hunter
Ronald Cohoon as Peter Hunter
Tommy Tweed as The Hermit
Robert Christie as James MacKenzie
Beth Lockerbie as Nell MacKenzie
Beth Amos as Mrs. Oakes
Eric Clavering as Bert Oakes
Jan Rubeš as Carl Nurmi
Syme Jago as Helvi Nurmi
Muffy the Bull Terrier as Bodger
Rink the Labrador Retriever as Luath
Syn Cat the Siamese cat as Tao
Rex Allen as The Narrator

Production
Before filming, producer Jack Couffer visited Burnford in Port Arthur, Ontario to photograph the surrounding countryside which he used to pinpoint a filming location that fitted the area as close as possible. This was necessary as the season in Ontario was too short to schedule the necessary filming.

There were three animal handlers; Hal Driscoll looked after the Labrador, Bill Koehler the Bull Terrier, and Al Niemela the cat.

Burnford spent seven days with the film crew, including one session where they filmed the Siamese cat "fishing in a creek, and landing its flapping catch with a lightningswift professional paw" as often as the director wished.

Accolades
The film is recognized by American Film Institute in these lists:
 2006: AFI's 100 Years...100 Cheers – Nominated

Remake
In 1993, Disney made a new version of the film, entitled Homeward Bound: The Incredible Journey. Featuring the voices of Don Ameche, Sally Field, and Michael J. Fox, the film keeps the same basic story line, but adds a subplot in which the kids are dealing with a new step-family. All three pets are renamed, the breeds of the dogs are changed, the sex of the cat is changed, and the ages of the original Labrador/Golden Retriever and Bull Terrier/American Bull Dog are switched. It also has vocalizations of the animals' thoughts and communications with each other.

Unlike the original story, the wilderness through which the three animals journey across is in the Sierra Nevada mountains, not the forested wilderness of Ontario.

The film was also followed by a sequel in 1996, entitled Homeward Bound II: Lost in San Francisco.

Filming locations
 Palgrave, Ontario (the hermit's cabin)
 Aspdin, Ontario (the village fly-over sequence in the intro)
 Lake Vernon, Ontario (the lake fly-over sequence in the intro)
 Mono Mills, Ontario (the family's home)
 Glen Cross, Ontario (the friendly hunter's farm)
 Sequim, Washington
 Smith Rock, Terrebonne, Oregon
 Devils Lake, Cascade Lakes Highway, Oregon
 South Sister, Oregon
 Wahclella Falls, Oregon

References

External links
  
 
 
 

1963 films
1960s English-language films
1963 adventure films
Films based on British novels
Films about dogs
Films about cats
Films produced by James Algar
Films produced by Walt Disney
Walt Disney Pictures films
Films set in Ontario
Films shot in Ontario
Films shot in Bend, Oregon
Films shot in Washington (state)
Films scored by Oliver Wallace
American adventure films
Canadian adventure films
Films directed by Fletcher Markle
1960s American films
1960s Canadian films